Tafoughalt or Taforalt (Berber: ⵜⴰⴼⵓⵖⴰⵍⵜ) is a town in Berkane Province, Oriental, Morocco. It’s in the centre of Aït Iznasen mountains.
According to the 2004 census it has a population of 3150.

References

Populated places in Berkane Province
Rural communes of Oriental (Morocco)